Black-eared wheatear has been split into the following 2 species:

 Western black-eared wheatear, Oenanthe hispanica
 Eastern black-eared wheatear, Oenanthe melanoleuca

Birds by common name